{{DISPLAYTITLE:C21H21N3O3}}
The molecular formula C21H21N3O3 may refer to:

 Ozenoxacin
 Spirotryprostatin B
 Nauclechine 
 CID 91763610 
 Cadamine